Meilleur (French for better) may refer to:

 Meilleurs Bay, community of Laurentian Hills, Ontario

People 
 Briane Meilleur (born 1992), Canadian curler
 Hubert Meilleur, Canadian politician
 Jean-Baptiste Meilleur (1796–1878), Canadian doctor, educator and political figure
 Jens Meilleur (born 1993), Canadian-German ice hockey player
 Madeleine Meilleur (b. 1948), Canadian politician
 Marie-Louise Meilleur (1880–1998), French Canadian supercentenarian
 Vincent Meilleur (* May 6, 1974) is a French ski mountaineer